The 1993 Family Circle Cup was a women's tennis tournament played on outdoor clay courts at the Sea Pines Plantation on Hilton Head Island, South Carolina in the United States and was part of Tier I of the 1993 WTA Tour. It was the 21st edition of the tournament and ran from March 29 through April 4, 1993. First-seeded Steffi Graf won the singles title, her fourth at the event.

Finals

Singles

 Steffi Graf defeated  Arantxa Sánchez Vicario 7–6(10–8), 6–1
 It was Graf's 2nd singles title of the year and the 71st of her career.

Doubles

 Gigi Fernández /  Natasha Zvereva defeated  Katrina Adams /  Manon Bollegraf 6–3, 6–1
 It was  Fernández' 4th doubles title of the year and the 35th of her career. It was Zvereva's 4th doubles title of the year and the 32nd of her career.

References

External links
 Official website
 ITF tournament edition details

Family Circle Cup
Charleston Open
Family Circle Cup
Family Circle Cup
Family Circle Cup
Family Circle Cup